The Czech Social Democratic Party (ČSSD) leadership election of 2007 was held on 21 March 2009. Jiří Paroubek was reelected as party's leader when he received 74%. Paroubek was the only candidate.

References

Czech Social Democratic Party leadership elections
Social Democratic Party leadership election
Social Democratic Party leadership election
Indirect elections
Single-candidate elections
Czech Social Democratic Party leadership election
Czech Social Democratic Party leadership election